José Ángel Galiñanes (12 March 1904 – September 1973) was a Puerto Rican sports shooter. He competed in the trap event at the 1952 Summer Olympics.

References

1904 births
1973 deaths
People from Sabana Grande, Puerto Rico
Puerto Rican male sport shooters
Olympic shooters of Puerto Rico
Shooters at the 1952 Summer Olympics